The European Union (Croatian Accession and Irish Protocol) Act 2013 (c. 5) is an Act of Parliament of the United Kingdom introduced to the House of Commons by William Hague. The Act made provisions consequential on the Treaty concerning the Accession of the Republic of Croatia to the European Union and on the Protocol on the concerns of the Irish people on the Treaty of Lisbon.

The Bill was discussed on the 6 and 27 November 2012 and passed and sent to the House of Lords on 27 November 2012. It had its third reading in the Lords on 21 January 2013. Royal Assent was given on 31 January 2013.

There are six sections of the Act. Sections 1 and 2 were repealed on 28 November 2018 by the European Union (Withdrawal) Act 2018 (Consequential Amendments) Regulations 2018.

Section 1: Approval of Croatian Accession Treaty
This section amended the European Union Act 2011, so as to accept the accession of Croatia to the European Union, and certified that this did not require a referendum. It was repealed on 28 November 2018 by the European Union (Withdrawal) Act 2018 (Consequential Amendments) Regulations 2018.

Section 2: Approval of Irish Protocol
The second section accepted the approval of the Irish Protocol, and certified that this did not require a referendum. The Protocol adapted the Lisbon Treaty in June 2009. It was repealed on 28 November 2018 by the European Union (Withdrawal) Act 2018 (Consequential Amendments) Regulations 2018.

Section 3: Addition of Croatian Accession Treaty and Irish Protocol to list of Treaties
This section adds the accession of Croatia and the Irish Protocol to the European Communities Act 1972.

Section 4: Freedom of movement for Croatian nationals as workers
This section amends the rights of Croatian nationals to work in the United Kingdom, including provisions of the Immigration, Asylum and Nationality Act 2006 and makes an offence the employment of a Croatian national without authorisation.

Section 5: Orders under section 4: Parliamentary control
This section sets out how provisions made under section 4 will be approved by both Commons and Lords.

Section 6: Extent, commencement and short title
This section confirms the extent of the Act throughout the United Kingdom and its short name.

See also
Treaty of Accession 2011
List of Acts of the Parliament of the United Kingdom relating to the European Communities / European Union

References

United Kingdom Acts of Parliament 2013
European Union law
Croatia–United Kingdom relations
Ireland–United Kingdom relations
2013 in the European Union
Acts of the Parliament of the United Kingdom relating to the European Union